Çorbalık kesme, corbalık kesme erişte or kare erişte are a traditional Turkish pasta made from flour, eggs, milk, and salt. They take the form of small squares or, in some regions, long thin strips (usually called by different names) similar to kesme.

Some common dishes made with çorbalık kesme are chicken noodle soups, kayseri kesme çorbası, baked chicken with red sauce, or simple boiled pasta dish with oil and cheese.

See also
Kesme
Farfel

Notes

Turkish cuisine
Turkish pasta
Types of pasta
Noodles